Plebecula anaglyptica is a species of land snail in the family Geomitridae. 

It is endemic to Madeira, where it is known only from the Ilhas Desertas.

This snail lives in grass tussocks among the rock litter. It has been threatened by habitat degradation caused by a population of goats living on the island. Most of the goats have been removed as part of efforts to preserve the habitat for this snail and other local species, so it is not considered to be as vulnerable at this time.

References

 Cameron, R. A. D., Teixeira, D., Pokryszko, B., Silva, I. & Groh, K. (2021). An annotated checklist of the extant and Quaternary land molluscs of the Desertas Islands, Madeiran Archipelago. Journal of Conchology. 44(1): 53-70.

Molluscs of Madeira
Gastropods described in 1852